This was the first edition of the tournament.

Rameez Junaid and David Pel won the title after defeating Filippo Baldi and Salvatore Caruso 7–5, 3–6, [10–7] in the final.

Seeds

Draw

References
 Main Draw

Firenze Tennis Cup - Doubles